The 1952–53 WHL season was the first season of the Western Hockey League. The Edmonton Flyers were the President's Cup champions as they beat the Saskatoon Quakers four games to two in the final series.

Final Standings 

bold - qualified for playoffs

Playoffs 

The Edmonton Flyers win the President's Cup 4 games to 2.

Awards

References 

Western Hockey League (1952–1974) seasons
1952–53 in American ice hockey by league
1952–53 in Canadian ice hockey by league